Saint-Germain-du-Puy is a commune in the Cher department in the Centre-Val de Loire region of France.

Geography
An area of both farming and light industry comprising a small suburban town and several hamlets situated on the banks of the rivers Colin and Yèvre, immediately east of Bourges at the junction of the N151 with the N142, D955 and D151 roads.

Population

53.3% of the population in Saint-Germain-du-Puy is more than 45 years old.

Sights
 The church of St. Germain, dating from the twentieth century.
 The château de Villemenard, built in the sixteenth century, now a farm.
 The two 16th-century watermills.
 The remains of a Roman aqueduct.

See also
Communes of the Cher department

References

Communes of Cher (department)